Ian Fairbrother (born 2 October 1966) is an English retired footballer. He spent the majority of his career in the United States.

He spent his youth career with Manchester United and Blackburn Rovers, but began his professional career in 1984 with Liverpool. He never played any games for Liverpool's first team, and moved to Bury on a free transfer in 1986. In 1988, he moved to the United States to play for the Fort Lauderdale Strikers in the American Soccer League. However, he is not listed with Fort Lauderdale's first team that year. During the summer of 1989, he played for the amateur Wichita Blue in the Heartland Soccer League. On 14 December 1989, he signed with the Wichita Wings of the Major Indoor Soccer League. In May 1990, he joined the Miami Freedom in the American Professional Soccer League. He returned to the Wings in August 1990, but lost the first two months of the MISL season after having an emergency appendectomy. He returned in December and played out the remainder of the season. In 1991, he moved to the Detroit Rockers in the National Professional Soccer League. The Rockers won the 1991-1992 league championship. He played only five games, scoring two goals, with the Rockers during the 1992–1993 season before losing the rest of the season to tendinitis of his Achilles tendon.  He returned for the 1993–1994 season, scoring 23 goals in 38 games. In 1994, he moved to the expansion Detroit Neon which played summer indoor soccer in the Continental Indoor Soccer League. Fairbrother remained with Detroit through the 1997 season. That year, the team was renamed the Detroit Safari. In August 1997, he served as the team's interim coach.

References

External links

 MISL stats

1966 births
Living people
Expatriate soccer players in the United States
English footballers
Bury F.C. players
American Professional Soccer League players
Continental Indoor Soccer League coaches
Continental Indoor Soccer League players
Detroit Neon players
Detroit Rockers players
Detroit Safari players
Liverpool F.C. players
Major Indoor Soccer League (1978–1992) players
National Professional Soccer League (1984–2001) players
Miami Freedom players
Wichita Blue players
Wichita Wings (MISL) players
Wrexham A.F.C. players
Fort Lauderdale Strikers (1988–1994) players
Association football midfielders
English expatriate sportspeople in the United States
English expatriate footballers
Sportspeople from Bootle
English football managers